The Battle of Kobryn took place on between 11 and 23 September 1920, during the Polish–Soviet War. Polish Fourth Army, commanded by General Leonard Skierski defeated Soviet forces in the area of Kobryn (present-day Belarus).

After the Battle of Warsaw, the Fourth Army was in early September 1920 transported eastwards, to guard the front along the rail line Bialystok – Brzesc nad Bugiem – Wlodawa. The Army consisted of the following units: 15th Infantry Division, 14th Infantry Division, 11th Infantry Division, and 16th Infantry Division.

Facing them was newly created Soviet Fourth Army, consisting of two rifle divisions (48th and 57th), and 17th Cavalry Division. These units were supported by 19th and 55th Rifle Divisions, which had completed their concentration in the first half of September. After additional reinforcements brought from Russia, the Soviets had a numerical advantage along the frontline.

General Skierski, aware of the Soviet plans, decided to forestall their advance, and ordered the 14th I.D. to capture Zhabinka 8 on September. On the night of 11 September, the Polish 11th I.D. destroyed the Soviet forces near Malaryta, and after this victory, Skierski ordered an assault on Kobryn, which was defended by the Soviet 57th Rifle Division. The Poles entered the town on the morning of 12 September, but the Soviets concentrated three divisions (55th, 57th and 19th) and on the night of 15–16 September attacked a gap between the Polish 14th and 16th I.D. The enemy captured a bridge over the Mukhavets River, and then attacked the Polish 57th Infantry Regiment. Heavy fighting ensued, but despite Soviet superiority, the Poles kept their ground.

On 16 September regiments of Polish 16th I.D. were forced to retreat, but on the next day, after reinforcements had been brought, Polish soldiers recaptured the lost territory. In two days of fighting (16 and 17 September) the Poles lost 500 soldiers dead and wounded, and to draw the Soviets away from Kobryn General Skierski created the Operational Group of General Michal Milewski to carry out a raid on Pruzhany. The town was captured on the night of 18–19 September but fighting there continued until 22 September.

Fighting over Kobryn and Pruzana tied down the whole Soviet Fourth Army, which removed the threat of the capture of Brest Fortress, and allowed the Polish Army headquarters to prepare an operational plan for the Battle of the Niemen River. Furthermore, the Soviet 12th Army, fighting in Volhynia, had to retreat, as its wing came under Polish pressure.

The battle is commemorated on the Tomb of the Unknown Soldier, Warsaw, with the inscription "KOBRYN 14 – 15 IX 1920".

Sources 
 

Battles of the Polish–Soviet War
Conflicts in 1920
1920 in Belarus
September 1920 events
Western Belorussia (1918–1939)
Military history of Belarus